Otshaandja is a village in Oshana Region, Namibia. It is the home village of Chief Samuel Ankama and Aram Martin, prominent politicians in SWAPO.

References

Populated places in the Oshana Region
Villages in Namibia